Traou Mad is a French delicacy produced in Pont-Aven, Brittany. It is a full fat butter cookie served for breakfast. Traoù Mat (in peurunvan orthography) stands for Good Things in Breton.

Traou Mad is a registered trademark.

See also
 Shortbread

References

External links
 Traou Mad history 

Biscuits
French cuisine
Breton cuisine